C-3PO or See-Threepio is a humanoid robot character in the Star Wars franchise who appears in the original trilogy, the prequel trilogy and the sequel trilogy. Built by Anakin Skywalker,  was designed as a protocol droid intended to assist in etiquette, customs, and translation, boasting that he is "fluent in over six million forms of communication". Along with his astromech droid counterpart and friend ,  provides comic relief within the narrative structure of the films, and serves as a foil. Anthony Daniels has portrayed the character in eleven of the twelve theatrical Star Wars films released to date, with the exception of Solo: A Star Wars Story, where the character does not appear.

Despite his oblivious nature,  has played a pivotal role in the galaxy's history, appearing under the service of Shmi Skywalker, the Lars homestead, Padmé Amidala, Bail Organa, Raymus Antilles, Luke Skywalker, Jabba the Hutt, and Leia Organa. In the majority of depictions,  physical appearance is primarily a polished gold plating with a silver plated right leg (from knee joint to ankle), although his appearance varies throughout the films; including the absence of metal coverings in The Phantom Menace, a dull copper plating in Attack of the Clones, and a red left arm in The Force Awakens.  also appears frequently in both canon and Star Wars Legends continuities of novels, comic books, and video games, and was a protagonist in the animated television series Droids.

Appearances

Skywalker saga

Original trilogy

Star Wars (1977)
In Star Wars, C-3PO is introduced to the audience when he and R2-D2 are aboard the consular ship Tantive IV when it is attacked by the Imperial Star Destroyer Devastator. When R2-D2 (Kenny Baker) attempts to leave the ship to deliver a secret message from Princess Leia (Carrie Fisher) to Obi-Wan Kenobi (Alec Guinness), C-3PO follows him into an escape pod, which lands on the planet Tatooine. There, the droids are captured by Jawas, and are taken to be sold. In the process of being sold to Owen Lars (Phil Brown), C-3PO convinces his new owner to buy R2-D2 as well (after they originally bought R5-D4 and his motivator exploded on the way back to the garage). The duo ultimately lead Lars' nephew, Luke Skywalker (Mark Hamill), to Obi-Wan, for whom R2-D2 plays Leia's message. After Imperial stormtroopers destroy the Lars homestead, C-3PO and R2-D2 go along with Luke and Obi-Wan on a mission to rescue Leia, transported by smugglers Han Solo (Harrison Ford) and Chewbacca (Peter Mayhew) on board the Millennium Falcon. When the ship is taken hostage on the Death Star, C-3PO helps R2-D2 shut down the space station's trash compactor, saving their human companions' lives, before escaping on board the Falcon. When R2-D2 is damaged during the Battle of Yavin, a grief-stricken C-3PO offers to donate his own parts to help repair his counterpart. C-3PO and a repaired R2-D2 are present at the celebration of the Death Star's destruction at the end of the film.

Throughout the film C-3PO is a foil to R2-D2's antics, even when C-3PO translates R2-D2's machine speech for the audience. C-3PO is originally the property of the captain on the Tantive IV, but seems to follow R2-D2 in a relationship akin to those between human children; C-3PO often following R2-D2 around, and R2-D2 needing C-3PO to translate for him. When R2-D2 is damaged in the Battle of Yavin, C-3PO offers to donate any mechanical parts helpful in his repair; but this transference is never confirmed.

The Empire Strikes Back (1980)
In The Empire Strikes Back, C-3PO is responsible for identifying the Empire's probe droid, alerting the Rebels to the Empire's awareness of their location on the sixth planet of the Hoth system. C-3PO escapes with Han, Chewbacca, and Leia in the Millennium Falcon, while R2-D2 joins Luke in his search for Yoda (Frank Oz). During this time C-3PO and Han are often shown as foils, with C-3PO quoting odds and Han defying them. After a chase through an asteroid field, the Falcon escapes to Cloud City at Bespin.

While exploring a room in Cloud City, C-3PO is blasted by an off-camera stormtrooper. In search of C-3PO, Chewbacca heads to the Ugnaught recycling facility where he finds the dismembered parts of the droid. When Darth Vader (portrayed by David Prowse, voiced by James Earl Jones) reveals his presence to the group that same day, Chewbacca is sent into a holding cell, but is permitted to rebuild the droid, which he does poorly. Thereafter, Chewbacca carries the partially rebuilt C-3PO on his back during Han's encasement in carbonite.

With the help of the city's administrator, Lando Calrissian (Billy Dee Williams), Princess Leia, Chewbacca, and C-3PO escape the city. Having C-3PO on Chewbacca's back proves to be beneficial, in that when Boba Fett (Jeremy Bulloch) escapes the city with a frozen Han, C-3PO notifies them of pursuing stormtroopers. While escaping Vader's forces, R2-D2 begins repairing C-3PO. Upon making their way to the Rebel's rendezvous point, C-3PO is fully repaired.

Return of the Jedi (1983)
In Return of the Jedi, Luke commands C-3PO and R2-D2 to deliver a message to Jabba the Hutt from Luke, who offers 3PO's services as a translator and R2-D2's on Jabba's flying sail barge. C-3PO's first translation for the crime lord is of the bounty hunter Boushh—Leia in disguise—claiming the bounty for Chewbacca as part of her plan to rescue Han. Later, Luke infiltrates the palace and kills Jabba's rancor in a duel; whereupon Jabba transfers his court to the sail barge with Luke, Han, and Chewbacca as food for the Sarlacc, while Leia serves as Jabba's slave. When Luke attempts escape, R2-D2 tosses him his lightsaber, with which he attacks Jabba's guards. In the midst of the battle, C-3PO is attacked by Jabba's pet Salacious Crumb, who pulls out his right photoreceptor before being driven off by R2-D2. Thereafter the two escape the sail barge and are retrieved by the protagonists.

C-3PO accompanies the strike force to the Forest Moon of Endor to disable the shield generator protecting the second Death Star. When he, Han, Luke, Chewbacca, and R2-D2 are captured by the Ewoks, C-3PO is perceived to be a god by the latter. When the human prisoners are threatened by the Ewoks, Luke uses the Force to levitate the droid above the crowd as demonstration of the supposed god's ability. Later that night, C-3PO narrates the history of the Rebel Alliance's fight against the Galactic Empire to the tribe, convincing them to help the Rebels at the Battle of Endor. After the Empire's second Death Star is destroyed, C-3PO joins the protagonists on Endor in celebrating the fall of the Empire.

Prequel trilogy

The Phantom Menace (1999)
C-3PO returns in Star Wars: Episode I – The Phantom Menace, the first chapter of the Star Wars prequel trilogy, where it was revealed that nine-year-old slave Anakin Skywalker (Jake Lloyd) built him out of spare parts. C-3PO meets his future partner, R2-D2, along with Jedi Master Qui-Gon Jinn (Liam Neeson), Queen Padmé Amidala (Natalie Portman) of Naboo, and Gungan Jar Jar Binks (Ahmed Best). C-3PO and R2-D2 help perfect Anakin's podracer for the Boonta Eve Classic race.
Shortly afterwards, C-3PO becomes part of Anakin's pit crew, where he sees Anakin defeat Sebulba. C-3PO and Anakin part ways when Qui-Gon frees the boy after winning a bet with Anakin's master, Watto. Before parting from C-3PO, Anakin assures the droid that his mother Shmi (Pernilla August) will not sell him.

Attack of the Clones (2002)
In Episode II – Attack of the Clones, set 10 years later, Shmi is kidnapped by a group of Tusken Raiders. Sensing that his mother is in danger, Anakin (now portrayed by Hayden Christensen) travels with Padmé to Tatooine, where they reunite with C-3PO, now with a metallic gray-colored body. He recognizes Anakin and Padmé and presents them to Anakin's stepfamily, Owen (Joel Edgerton) and Cliegg Lars (Jack Thompson) and Beru Whitesun (Bonnie Piesse). When Anakin returns with his mother's body, C-3PO attends her funeral.

After Anakin and Padmé's visit to Tatooine, C-3PO accompanies them to the planet Geonosis to rescue Obi-Wan Kenobi (Ewan McGregor) from Sith Lord Count Dooku (Christopher Lee). Shortly afterward, he follows R2-D2 into a droid-construction site, where his head is temporarily attached to the torso of a battle droid, while the head of the droid is placed onto C-3PO's torso. Influenced by the battle droid's programming, he reluctantly participates in the film's climactic battle scene, where he is stopped by Jedi Kit Fisto (Silas Carson). Having been restored by R2-D2, he leaves Geonosis with the other protagonists. At the end of the film, he is a witness to Padmé and Anakin's marriage on Naboo.

Revenge of the Sith (2005)
In Episode III – Revenge of the Sith, C-3PO is aware of Padmé's pregnancy and, in a deleted scene, is present during a secret meeting held with Senators Bail Organa (Jimmy Smits) and Mon Mothma (Genevieve O'Reilly). After Anakin falls to the dark side of the Force and becomes the Sith Lord Darth Vader, he takes C-3PO and R2-D2 with him as he massacres the Jedi; C-3PO rationalizes Vader's behavior by saying he has been under a great deal of stress. C-3PO accompanies Padmé to Mustafar, and witnesses Vader using the Force to choke her into unconsciousness; whereupon C-3PO and R2-D2 take her to safety. When Obi-Wan returns to their spaceship following a duel with Vader, C-3PO pilots it to Polis Massa and witnesses Padmé give birth to the Skywalker twins, Luke and Leia, and die shortly afterward. C-3PO and R2-D2 become Organa's property, and he gives them to Captain Raymus Antilles (Rohan Nichol) to serve aboard the Tantive III, and orders C-3PO's memory erased in order to protect the Skywalker children from their father and the newly created Galactic Empire.

Sequel trilogy

The Force Awakens (2015)
Anthony Daniels reprised the role of C-3PO in The Force Awakens, the first installment of the sequel trilogy. C-3PO is seen with a red left arm, but gets a gold arm at the end of the film. He has been upgraded to seven million forms of communication. In the film, he is first seen along with Leia and a Resistance team, picking up Han, the stormtrooper Finn (John Boyega), the droid BB-8, the scavenger Rey (Daisy Ridley), and Chewbacca on the planet Takodana. During their adventures, C-3PO is reunited with R2-D2, who is reactivated after having been shut off for years.

The Last Jedi (2017)
In The Last Jedi, C-3PO mostly serves as an assistant for Leia and, while she is unconscious, Resistance pilot Poe Dameron (Oscar Isaac); he spends much of the film voicing his concern over the protagonist's chances in missions such as the evacuation of D'Qar at the start of the film and Finn and Rose Tico's (Kelly Marie Tran) mission on the Mega-class Star Dreadnought Supremacy later on. At the end of the film, C-3PO has a brief reunion with Luke, who winks at him before confronting the film's villain, First Order leader Kylo Ren (Adam Driver).

According to Daniels, "In The Last Jedi I became a table decoration, which I regretted, because Threepio was worth more than that."

The Rise of Skywalker (2019)
In The Rise of Skywalker, he accompanies Rey, Finn, Poe, Chewbacca, and BB-8 to Pasaana to meet with Luke's contact, who knows about a Sith artifact; the contact turns out to be Lando. During the journey, they discover a Sith dagger and try to translate its inscriptions as they hold a clue to the whereabouts of Palpatine (Ian McDiarmid) and the Sith Eternal's fleet, the Final Order, but it is revealed that C-3PO's programming prevents him translating such a language directly. The heroes manage to find a hacker on the planet Kijimi who can bypass the protocols preventing C-3PO from translating the message, but at the cost of wiping his memories. Reactivated after he has provided the translation, C-3PO accompanies the group until they return to the Resistance camp, at which point R2-D2 is able to restore his memory from an earlier back-up created just prior to Rey's first mission. He celebrates the Sith Eternal's defeat with the rest of the Resistance at the end. In part of the film, the character appears with red eyes.

Anthology films
C-3PO makes a brief appearance alongside R2-D2 in Rogue One (2016), accompanying Rebel Alliance troops to Scarif alongside Princess Leia.

Other media

Canon

Novels
After the events of Return of the Jedi, C-3PO continues to serve Leia Organa in several novels including Bloodline.

Comics
C-3PO appears in Marvel's Star Wars comic series and accompanies Han Solo on a raid on an Imperial outpost in the miniseries Shattered Empire. The circumstances that caused his left arm to be replaced with a red one  is told in Marvel's one-shot Star Wars special, C-3PO: The Phantom Limb. He also appears in Star Wars: Poe Dameron.

Legends

Novels
In April 2014, most of the licensed Star Wars novels and comics produced since the originating 1977 film Star Wars were rebranded by Lucasfilm as Star Wars Legends and declared non-canon to the franchise.

According to the Star Wars comic strip,  was activated hundreds of years before the events of the original film on the planet Affa. A Guide to the Star Wars Universe affirms Affa as the droid's planet of origin, narrowing down his activation date to 112 years before A New Hope. In The Phantom Menace (1999), it is revealed that  was built by a young Anakin Skywalker. In the non-canon Star Wars Tales story "Thank the Maker", Vader remembers finding the defunct droid in Watto's junk heap and guessing it is several decades old.

In Star Wars media involving the Clone Wars, C-3PO serves as Padmé Amidala's personal protocol droid. In "The New Face of War", a story in Star Wars: Republic, Queen Jamillia appoints the droid to serve as liaison to the Jedi during that campaign following the defense of Naboo and the bio-plague of Ohma-D'un by the Separatists. He is a reluctant participant in many of Padmé's adventures, including a hazardous mission during the Battle of Ilum, in which his loyalty is essential in helping Jedi Master Yoda rescue fellow Jedi Luminara Unduli and Barriss Offee.

In Expanded Universe material set after Return of the Jedi, C-3PO assists Leia, Luke, and their allies in the Alliance (and later, the New Republic) on many missions. Due to his function as a protocol droid, he most often stays with Leia Organa-Solo on Coruscant, assisting her political duties, while R2-D2 often stays with Luke at the Jedi Academy.

In The Truce at Bakura, C-3PO translates Ssi-ruuvi, the language of the Ssi-ruuk, to aid the Alliance. In The Glove of Darth Vader, C-3PO and R2-D2 are members of the Senate Planetary Intelligence Network (SPIN), and undergo transformation by the Droid Modification Team to be disguised as Kessel droids so that they could infiltrate a gathering of Imperials to find out who is planning to take control of the Empire.

In The Courtship of Princess Leia, C-3PO is led to believe that Han Solo is ancestrally the King of Corellia during Han's competition with Prince Isolder for Leia's hand in marriage. C-3PO agrees to assist Han as a counselor droid; but is shocked when Han kidnaps Leia and takes her to Dathomir. Despite this, he continues to present Han in the best possible light and writes a song for him entitled "The Virtues of King Han Solo", which he backs with the sound of a full symphony orchestra. He later discovers that Han's ancestor was merely "a pretender to the throne", but is present at Han and Leia's wedding.

Following the events of Han and Leia's marriage, C-3PO returns with them to Tatooine in Tatooine Ghost. There he helps Han and Leia in their search for an Alderaanian moss painting storing a valuable code. He also reunites with Kitster Banai and Wald, childhood friends of Anakin Skywalker from Episode I. With their help, C-3PO and the others discover Shmi Skywalker's diary, whereof Leia remarks that the droid described reminds her of C-3PO. Due to his memory wipe in Episode III, C-3PO does not mention to Han and Leia his connection to Anakin. The code is eventually found and destroyed.

In Heir to the Empire, Lando reprograms C-3PO to sound like Leia in order to hide from Imperials on Nkllon; but the Empire, led by Grand Admiral Thrawn, sees through the deception. In Dark Force Rising, C-3PO goes to Honoghr with Leia during the Thrawn Crisis to discover what had caused the plight of the Noghri. He is forced to hide with Leia and Chewbacca when Imperial forces arrive overhead, but he later returns with Leia to Coruscant, where she gives birth to Jaina and Jacen Solo. He serves as caretaker to the twins, and later Anakin Solo as well. In The Last Command, C-3PO also accompanies Han, Lando, R2-D2, Luke, Chewbacca, and Mara Jade to Wayland on a mission to destroy the Mount Tantiss storehouse. Thanks to C-3PO and some Noghri, the party recruits aid from the local population and destroys the storehouse.

In Dark Apprentice, the Solo twins escape from Chewbacca's and C-3PO's watch during a trip to a zoo on Coruscant and arrive in the planet's sub-levels. C-3PO frantically searches for them, but they had been found by King Onibald Daykim and are reunited with their parents.

In Planet of Twilight, C-3PO and R2-D2 accompany Leia on a diplomatic mission to Nam Chorios but are unable to prevent her kidnapping and fail to stop the Death Seed plague unleashed on the crew by Seti Ashgad and Dzym. Eventually rescued by Han and Lando, the two droids convey their message for help.

In The Crystal Star, C-3PO accompanies Luke and Han to Crseih Station to investigate the possible existence of Jedi trainees; but instead find Waru, a creature from another dimension, from whom they learn of Waru's alliance with Lord Hethrir and of the kidnapping of the Solo children. Hethrir is destroyed following a confrontation with Leia, Han, and Luke while Waru returns to his dimension.

In The Black Fleet Crisis, C-3PO accompanies Lando, R2-D2, and Lando's associate Lobot to investigate the runaway alien ship Teljkon Vagabond; eventually to discover that the ship contains the last vestiges of the Quella civilization.

In The New Rebellion, C-3PO, along with R2-D2 and a young mechanic named Cole Fardreamer, is instrumental in stopping Kueller from regaining power by disabling the explosive devices he had placed in a large number of droids.

In Ambush at Corellia, during the outbreak of the First Corellian Insurrection, C-3PO and Chewbacca retrieve Jaina, Jacen, and Anakin from the burning Corona House. In Showdown at Centerpoint, Threepio accompanies Luke, Gaeriel Captison, Belindi Kalenda, and Lando Calrissian to Centerpoint Station, and alerts them to the fact that the temperature inside Hollowtown is increasing to dangerously high levels. In Vision of the Future, C-3PO participates in Talon Karrde's expedition to the Kathol Sector to find Jorj Car'das, serving as a translator.

Animated series 

C-3PO appears in the animated segment of the Star Wars Holiday Special: The Story of the Faithful Wookiee set between A New Hope and The Empire Strikes Back. He and R2-D2 accompany Luke Skywalker and crash on the surface of Panna. They are almost eaten by a dragon but a mysterious bounty hunter, Boba Fett rescues them. Fett presents himself as an ally to the heroes and offers to help them. Initially, Luke thinks that Fett seems friendly but C-3PO is unsure. While Fett and Chewbacca set off to find the cure, C-3PO looks after Luke and Han with the upside-down position to slow down the disease's progress. R2-D2 intercepts a transmission between Darth Vader and Fett so the droids inform the heroes about Fett's true allegiances before the bounty hunter blasts away.  

During the Droids series, set between Revenge of the Sith and A New Hope, C-3PO and R2-D2 are traded to various masters. 

In Clone Wars, C-3PO's outer plating are upgraded to a shiny bronzium coating due to his tenure as Padmé's servant. He also disapproves of combat droids, once demanding to "have a serious talk with their programmer".

Comics 
Lucasfilm did not require these to tie into the animated series of the same name. Anthony Daniels and Ryder Windham also co-wrote a one-shot comic titled The Protocol Offensive (1997), based on a story by Brian Daley and with art by Igor Kordey.

In Empire's End, C-3PO and R2-D2 are nearly destroyed after they spot an Imperial installing a homing beacon on the Millennium Falcon; but are saved by Han Solo and Chewbacca. The resurrected Palpatine and his fleet discover the Alliance's existence, leading C-3PO and the others to flee to Iziz, a city on the planet of Onderon. Palpatine eventually finds them, but is mortally wounded by Han and destroyed when Empatojayos Brand sacrifices himself to save the latter's son Anakin.

In the non-canon Star Wars Tales story Storyteller, C-3PO is found partially destroyed and abandoned, years after the events of the original trilogy, by two slave boys. He tells them stories of Luke Skywalker's adventures, and they imagine the stories played out by members of their own alien race. As he is finishing his tale, a Vindar slavedriver appears, blasts C-3PO's head off, and kills Otalp. After the Vindar leave the cave, Remoh finds a lightsaber in the remains of C-3PO's body and in so doing, finds hope for his people's freedom.

Television 
The US Department of Health and Human Services sponsored an approximately 1 minute long anti smoking television public service announcement. In the PSA, C-3PO finds R2-D2 holding a cigarette, and warns R2 of the dangerous nature of smoking.

Behind the scenes

Anthony Daniels did not initially agree to be cast as C-3PO, but changed his mind after reading the character's part in the script and seeing a concept painting by Ralph McQuarrie, who based his early design largely on Walter Schulze-Mittendorff's Maschinenmensch from the Fritz Lang film Metropolis (1927). The initial costume had to be roughened so it would not reflect too much light. Daniels tried on the full costume for the first time the day before shooting began, and did not see its final appearance until being shown a Polaroid photograph of it while he wore the suit. George Lucas originally envisioned the character as "more of a con man" with an American accent, but changed his mind after Daniels' voice performance outshone that of 30 other actors that tested for the role. Mel Blanc was considered for the role, but according to Daniels, Blanc told Lucas that Daniels was better for the part.

C-3PO has been played by Daniels in 11 Star Wars films—ten live action (every episode of the Skywalker Saga and one Anthology film) and one animated. In The Phantom Menace, a skeletal C-3PO model was puppeteered by Michael Lynch (who was also a model maker for all three prequel films), with Daniels providing the voice, and Lynch was removed in post-production. Daniels attempted to puppeteer the skeletal droid for Episode II, but experienced difficulties; the puppet was replaced in favor of a fully plated C-3PO. A filmed scene featured Padmé outfitting C-3PO with his plating, but it was cut to improve the pacing. From Attack of the Clones to The Rise of Skywalker, as well as Rogue One, Daniels both wore the costume and provided the voice.

Daniels also played C-3PO in the live-action segments of Star Wars Holiday Special (1978), and voiced the character in the animated portion. Daniels appeared as C-3PO at the 50th Academy Awards in 1978 and 88th Academy Awards in 2016. He also voiced C-3PO in the radio drama adaptations of the original trilogy and five Star Wars animated series: Droids (1985–86), Clone Wars (2003–05), The Clone Wars (2008–14), Rebels (2014–18) and Resistance (2018–20). He reprised his role in The Lego Movie, in which  has a cameo appearance with crew members of the Millennium Falcon, and in the Star Wars Forces of Destiny episode "Beasts of Echo Base", in which his voice can be heard on Leia's comlink. Daniels also voiced  in Ralph Breaks the Internet (2018), various animated Lego Star Wars productions and video games. Star Wars Galaxy of Adventures features some of C-3PO's dialogue from the Skywalker Saga. C-3PO was featured with R2-D2, BB-8 and Chewbacca in Star Wars Blips.

Daniels reprised his role of C-3PO for the Disneyland ride Star Tours, co-created by George Lucas in 1987. He was videotaped while recording the dialogue, with the tape serving as a reference for the Imagineers to program an audio-animatronic  in the queue area. Both it and the audio-animatronic R2-D2 are the original props used in filming. Daniels also donned the costume for certain video segments played before and after the simulator ride itself, also portraying an electronically disguised Ewok announcer. Daniels also appeared in the  costume for various promotional materials for Star Tours, including the electronic press kit, a Disney special on Star Tours hosted by Gil Gerard, and various opening day skits. When Star Tours opened a bilingual version at Disneyland Paris, Daniels re-recorded  dialogue in French.  ends up in the pilot's seat of the Starspeeder 1000 in the attraction's successor, Star Tours – The Adventures Continue, in which he is also played by Daniels.

Daniels made several appearances as C-3PO on numerous TV shows and commercials, notably on a Star Wars-themed episode of The Donny and Marie Show in 1977, Disneyland's 35th Anniversary, a Star Wars-themed episode of The Muppet Show in 1980 and Multi-Coloured Swap Shop in 1981. Along with R2-D2, he also has a role as the character on Sesame Street episodes 1364 and 1396. They also hosted several documentaries including The Making of Star Wars and Star Wars: Connections. Daniels reprised his role in Obi-Wan Kenobi.

In 1977, a photograph appeared on a Topps Star Wars trading card in which  appeared to have a prominent phallus. It was later withdrawn from circulation. In 2007, the official Star Wars website hypothesized that this was caused by a part of the suit that had fallen into place just as the photograph was taken. However, in 2019 Daniels clarified that the costume had become compromised during 's oil bath in A New Hope; the warm liquid had caused the costume to separate, leading to "an over-exposure of plastic in that region". He further speculated in his 2019 autobiography that an artist had painted in the extended appendage.

Cultural influence

C-3PO was inducted into the Robot Hall of Fame in 2004 in Pittsburgh, Pennsylvania.  A lifesize replica can be seen at the Carnegie Science Center in Pittsburgh.

The robot was built for the purpose of extinguishing fires, but has similar movement abilities to the Star Wars droid by being able to climb ladders and carry hoses.

One of NASA programs to collaborate with the private sector in the development of commercial space transportation it's named 'C3PO', acronym for Commercial Crew & Cargo Program Office.

The cover photo of the August 2015 issue of GQ featured comedian Amy Schumer wearing a replica of Princess Leia's bikini and sucking one of  fingers. Lucasfilm and Disney objected to this image and tweeted a public statement that it was unauthorized.

In the Italian version of the original trilogy,  was named "D-3BO". Anglicisms were not common in the Italian language during the 1970s and 1980s, and the names of various characters were changed to be easier to pronounce and recognize for Italian speakers. Some of these changes were reverted in the dubbing of the prequel and sequel trilogies, where the original name  was used instead. Other name changes in the Italian version of the original trilogy include R2-D2, Han Solo, Leia Organa and Darth Vader, who were called respectively "C1-P8", "Ian Solo", "Leila Organa" and "Dart Fener" (or "Lord Fener").

See also
 R2-D2
 BB-8
 Anakin Skywalker

Notes

References
Footnotes

Citations

External links

 
 

Characters created by George Lucas
Film characters introduced in 1977
Fictional linguists
Male characters in film
Male characters in television
Star Wars droid characters
Star Wars Anthology characters
Star Wars Skywalker Saga characters
Star Wars: The Clone Wars characters
Star Wars Rebels characters
Star Wars Resistance characters
Star Wars literary characters
Fictional polyglots